Baldev Singh Dhillon is an internationally renowned agricultural scientist and had been the vice chancellor of Punjab Agricultural University from 2011 to 2021 in India.

Earlier, he worked as an Assistant Director General at ICAR, Director of NBPGR (ICAR),  and as Director of Research at Punjab Agricultural University and Guru Nanak Dev University. He worked at University of Hohenheim, Stuttgart, Germany from 1976 to 1978, 1988 to 1990 and 2007 to 2011, the International Maize and Wheat Improvement Center, Mexico, from 1993 to 1994, and at the University of Birmingham, UK in 1989 in Maize breeding, genetics and biotechnology.

Dhillon worked as the Vice Chancellor of Punjab Agricultural University from July 2011 to 30 June 2021. Under his dynamic leadership, PAU has earned a number of accolades:
 Ranked as the ‘Best Agricultural University’ and ‘Third Best Agricultural Research Institute’ in India by ICAR, 2017
 Ranked ‘First in Punjab,’ and ‘Second Best Agricultural University in India’  by Union Ministry of Human Resource Development, 2017
 Ranked first in research articles and citations in 2017 by CII-Indian Citation Index
 Occupied first position for development of landmark varieties – honour bestowed by Indian Society of Genetics and Plant Breeding, 2017
 Ranked second in India and 232nd rank in world, based on scientific papers for world universities by National Taiwan University, 2017
 PAU adjudged as one of the 70 Icons of Modern India by the leading magazine, India Today, in its special issue on 70 years of Independence entitled as "Icons of Modern India"
Dhillon was born in Amritsar in 1947. He is known for scientific breakthroughs in plant breeding. Dhillon did his B.Sc. in agriculture from Khalsa College, Amritsar; Post graduation M.Sc. from Punjab Agricultural University and Doctorate from the Indian Agricultural Research Institute (IARI), New Delhi. He has published 350 research publications and many books.

International awards

Maize Champion for Asia Award by CIMMYT (Citation is missing)
DAAD Post-Doc. Fellowship.
Alexander von Humboldt (AvH) Post-Doc. Fellowship.
AvH - Europe Fellowship (University of Birmingham).
University of Hohenheim Post-Doc. Fellowship.
Associate Scientistship, International Maize and Wheat Improvement Center(CIMMYT).

National awards
Padma Shri award 2019
JC Bose National Fellowship, Department of Science and Technology (2013–15)
Fellow: Indian National Science Academy (FNA).
Fellow: National Academy of Agricultural Sciences (FNAAS).
Fellow: National Academy of Sciences, India (FNASc).
Fellow: Punjab Academy of Sciences India (FPAS).
Dr NL Dhawan Lifetime Achievement Award, Maize Technologists Association of India
Life Time Achievement Award, Punjab Academy of Sciences 
NAAS Dr B.P. Pal Memorial Prize
ICAR Rafi Ahmed Kidwai Memorial Prize
NAAS Recognition Award
Om Prakash Bhasin Award
Dr Joginder Singh Memorial Award
Dr Harbhajan Singh Memorial Award
IARI Gold Medal
Punjab State Council for Science and Technology – Appreciation Certificate
Punjab Academy of Sciences-Life Time Achievement Award

References

Further reading
https://web.archive.org/web/20120829174602/http://articles.timesofindia.indiatimes.com/2011-06-17/ludhiana/29669232_1_pau-vc-punjab-agricultural-university-doctorate
http://www.indianexpress.com/news/Dhillon-new-PAU-VC/804802/
https://web.archive.org/web/20121015205659/http://ibnlive.in.com/generalnewsfeed/news/b-s-dhillon-new-vc-of-pau/728280.html
http://www.tribuneindia.com/2011/20110617/main6.htm
https://web.archive.org/web/20071025070259/http://www.punjabnewsline.com/content/view/4710/38/
http://www.tribuneindia.com/2007/20070404/nation.htm#7
http://naasindia.org/Announcements/NewsLetter.pdf
http://www.indiaedunews.net/Science/Two_scientists_to_receive_Bhasin_Award_769/

External links
 https://web.archive.org/web/20071025070259/http://www.punjabnewsline.com/content/view/4710/38/

Emeritus Professors in India
1947 births
Scientists from Amritsar
Academic staff of Punjab Agricultural University
Indian geneticists
Indian agriculturalists
Living people
Guru Nanak Dev University alumni
Indian Sikhs
Fellows of the National Academy of Agricultural Sciences
20th-century Indian biologists
Recipients of the Padma Shri in science & engineering